Cherry Mardia is an Indian film and television actress. She is known for role in Jigariyaa, Kadaram Kondan and Holiday: A Soldier Is Never Off Duty.

Career 
She made her acting debut in Bollywood in 2014 film Holiday: A Soldier Is Never Off Duty. She was the lead actress in the film Jigariyaa. The film was critically appreciated and her performance garnered much praise. In 2019, she starred in Kadaram Kondan, which marked her Tamil debut.

Filmography

TV series

Films

References

External links

 

Living people
Year of birth missing (living people)
Actresses from Mumbai
Female models from Mumbai
Indian film actresses
Indian television actresses
Actresses in Hindi cinema
Actresses in Tamil cinema
Actresses in Hindi television
21st-century Indian actresses